DYTV-TV (channel 13) is a television station in Metro Cebu, Philippines, serving as the Visayas flagship of the Intercontinental Broadcasting Corporation. The station maintains hybrid analog and digital transmitting facility is located at Legacy Village, Brgy. Kalunasan, Cebu City.

Former personalities
Janice Callino

IBC 13 Cebu previously aired programs 
Newsday Cebu (1982–1990)

Area of coverage
 Cebu City
 Cebu Province
 Portion of Bohol
 Portion of Leyte
 Portion of Southern Leyte

Digital television

Digital channels

DYTV-TV's digital signal operates on UHF channel 17 (491.143 MHz) and broadcasts on the following subchannels:

See also 
 List of Intercontinental Broadcasting Corporation channels and stations

Television stations in Cebu City
Intercontinental Broadcasting Corporation stations
Television channels and stations established in 1965
Digital television stations in the Philippines